Catriona Ward is an American and British horror novelist.

Biography

Catriona Ward was born in Washington, D.C. Her family moved a lot and she grew up all over the world, including in the United States, Kenya, Madagascar, Yemen, and Morocco. Dartmoor was the one place the family returned to on a regular basis.

Ward read English at St Edmund Hall, Oxford. Ward initially worked as an actor based in New York.

When she returned to London she worked on her first novel while writing for a human rights foundation until she left to take an MA in creative writing from the University of East Anglia. That novel, Rawblood (distributed in the United States as The Girl from Rawblood), was published in 2015.

Now she writes novels and short stories, and reviews for various publications. Ward won the August Derleth Award for Best Horror Novel in 2016 at the British Fantasy Awards for Rawblood and again in 2018 for Little Eve, making her the first woman to win the prize twice. Little Eve also went on to win the prestigious Shirley Jackson Award for best novel. Her next gothic thriller, The Last House on Needless Street, was published through Viper Books (an imprint of Serpent's Tail) in March 2021, and Tor Nightfire (Tor Books) in the US, in September 2021. Andy Serkis and Jonathan Cavendish’s The Imaginarium Productions has optioned film rights to the book.

Ward lives in London and Devon.

Awards

Bibliography

Novels

Short Fiction

References and sources

Year of birth missing (living people)
Alumni of St Edmund Hall, Oxford
Alumni of the University of East Anglia
Novelists from Washington, D.C.
American women novelists
British women novelists
21st-century American novelists
21st-century British novelists
21st-century American women writers
21st-century British women writers
American horror novelists
British horror writers
Women horror writers
Living people